Buckhead Shore is an American reality television series, which premiered on MTV on June 23, 2022. Like its predecessors, the reality show documents nine young adults who live together for the summer.

Cast 
 Adamo Giraldo
 Bethania Locke
 Chelsea Prescott
 DJ Simmons
 Katie Canham
 Julian "JuJu" Barney
 Parker Lipman
 Patrick Muresan
 Savannah Nicole Gabriel

Episodes

References

External links 
 
 

2022 American television series debuts
2020s American reality television series
English-language television shows
MTV reality television series
Television shows set in Atlanta
Television shows filmed in Atlanta